Shabab Al-Ahli Club is a Emirati professional association football club based in Dubai, that currently plays in the UAE ADNOC Pro League. Al-Ahli is one of the most successful clubs in the UAE.

Al Ahli FC has won 7 league titles, a record of 10 UAE's President Cup titles, 5 UAE super Cup titles, 5 UAE League Cup titles and 1 Emirati-Moroccan Super Cup, earning a total of 41 titles, making them the second most successful team in UAE. In the latest ranking by the IFFHS, Shabab Al Ahli is the 7th best club in Asia and ranked 110th in the world.

In 2017, the Dubai CSC and Al Shabab merged within Al Ahli FC making Shabab Al Ahli FC.

History

Establishment

Al Ahli club was established in 1970 when two local football teams Al Wehdah and Al Shabab (est. 1958) joined together for a training camp in Egypt but decided to merge as one single club under first club president H.E. Nasser Abdulla Hussain Lootah. Four years later another local team Al Najah joined to form Al Ahli Club.

Al Ahli translates to "domestic or national" in Arabic. The club won three UAE Arabian Gulf League titles in the 1970s and won its fourth in 2006, fifth in 2009, sixth in 2014 and seventh in 2016.

1973–1980: The golden age and aftermath decline

It took Al Ahli only four years after its establishment to win the UAE Arabian Gulf League twice consecutively in 1974-75 and 1975-76 then again in 1979-80 for the third time, which allowed them to permanently keep the league trophy. The victorious team, led by coach Mohamed Shehta and featuring players such as Hassan Nazari and Hassan Roshan. The team also won three President Cup titles during that period. Drawing hometown fans, Al Ahli has been and continues to be one of the most popular sports teams in the UAE. However, the club went into decline for few decades, the result of which saw the club relegated to the second division (1995–96) in a dramatic way, when Al Ahli played against neighbour rival Al Shabab, Al Ahli needed just one point from the match to stay in the first division. Al Ahli has lost the match and Al Shabab has won the league title. The same year, Al Ahli won the President Cup title. After a period of decline, Al Ahli went back on top under the new leadership of Sheikh Hamdan bin Mohammed bin Rashid Al Maktoum, the Deputy Ruler of Dubai, winning its fourth league title in 2006 and the following years, Al Ahli continued to be a successful club in the UAE by winning 6 President Cups. The early 2000s saw Iranian legend Ali Karimi play multiple seasons for Al Ahli, finishing as league top scorer in 2003-04 and being named Asian footballer of the year 2004.

2009 FIFA Club World Cup
Al-Ahli, as 2008–09 UAE Pro-League champions and as Abu Dhabi was hosting the event, qualified for the 2009 FIFA Club World Cup which was held in December 2009. They lost 0–2 to Auckland City in their only game in the competition.

Bouncing Back 
The club began to rise again and in 2010 with Abdullah Al Naboodah, the squad was gradually re-built, with the likes of Fabio Cannavaro and Grafite and Ricardo Quaresma joined the Emirati homegrown talents Ahmed Khalil and Ismael Al Hammadi. In 2012, Al Ahli won the UAE President's Cup and the Arabian Gulf Cup. The arrival of the Romanian football manager Cosmin Olaroiu in 2013, set the stage for a highly successful 2013–14 season. Al Ahli performed strongly in the league and assured its 6th title with a record for the highest ever points total for a league season (62). In addition, the club won the Arabian Gulf Cup, 2 Arabian Gulf Super Cups (2013–14, 2014–15) and in the following year they reached 2015 AFC Champions League Final which they narrowly lost to the Chinese team Guangzhou Evergrande 1–0 on aggregate. Al Ahli homegrown forward Ahmed Khalil named the UAE's sole recipient of the prestigious Asian Footballer of the Year award in 2015. In 2016, they again won their 7th domestic league title with two matches to play.

2017 Merge
In 2017 the clubs Dubai CSC and Al Shabab joined with Al-Ahli FC to form Shabab Al Ahli FC. The merge was seen as a controversial move as it meant combining the success of rival club Al Shabab with Al Ahli and it also meant missing the AFC Champions League for the first three years of its existence since it requires a club to exist for three years to obtain an AFC licence. However, the team would quickly experience success as they would win the League Cup and President's Cup in 2019.

Crest and nickname 

The original Al Ahli logo reflected a falcon on top of football and the words "Al Ahli Club" written horizontally. After rebranding themselves to Red Knights in 2006, the logo changed to a horse head shape with the letters "AC" (Al Ahli Club) on top. The new logo represents strength and high spirits also it goes along with the new nickname Red Knights instead of the old nickname the Red Devils.

A new logo was created after the merge between Dubai CSC and Al Shabab that made Shabab Al-Ahli.

Grounds 
Rashid Stadium is a multi-purpose stadium in Dubai, United Arab Emirates that was named after Sheikh Rashid bin Saeed Al Maktoum. It is currently used mostly for football & Rugby matches. The stadium holds 12,000 people. It was built in 1948. It is the home ground of Shabab Al-Ahli. Shabab Al Ahli also has Maktoum bin Rashid Al Maktoum Stadium and Al Aweer
Stadium as a second and third home ground for the club after merging with Al Shabab and Dubai in 2017.

Rivalries 
Shabab Al Ahli rivalry with Al Ain is gaining popularity as the two clubs alternated as champions in the 70s and more after 2010, and currently, both teams are considered among the top teams in the UAE. The match usually creates a lively atmosphere. Al Nasr and Al Wasl are also neighbouring rivals competing for who is the best team in Dubai

Active departments 

The club is also known as Al Ahli Castle because of its involvement in other professional sports. The club competes in basketball, volleyball, handball, track sport, table tennis and track cycling. Al Ahli is also known for its involvement in cultural activities and community services. Al Ahli Drama club established in 1981, to promote Emirati arts and theatrical plays focusing on UAE tradition, heritage and current events.

Relationship with La Liga 
In 2016 Al Ahli became the first foreign club to sign a partnership agreement with La Liga that is the first of its kind for both the renowned professional Spanish league and the Arabian Gulf League leaders. The signing of the agreement, which was staged at La Liga's headquarters, marks the beginning of a linkup in which La Liga's experience will be used to support Dubai's leading club in its development especially a training program from youth coaches in Spain will be applied. The club's junior sides will gain invitations to leading tournaments there, providing the opportunity to gain valuable experience playing top-class opposition.

Pro-League record

Notes 2019–20 UAE football season was cancelled due to the COVID-19 pandemic in the United Arab Emirates.

Key
 Pos. = Position
 Tms. = Number of teams
 Lvl. = League

Club officials

Current squad

As of UAE Pro-League:

Unregistered players

Out on loan

Shabab Al Ahli from Board Of Directors

Sheikh Hamdan Bin Mohammed Al Maktoum – President
Sheikh Maktoum Bin Mohammed Al Maktoum – Vice President
Sheikh Ahmed Bin Mohammed Al Maktoum – Chairman
Sheikh Mansour Bin Mohammed Al Maktoum – Deputy Chairman

Board members

Khalifa Sulaiman
Sami Al-Qamzi 
Mohammed Al Gergawi
Essam Al Humaidan 
Mohammed Ahmed Al-Marri
Hisham Abdullah Al Qassem
Abdullah Mohammed Al Basti
Ahmed Mohammed bin Humaidan

Shabab Al Ahli Football Company Board Directors

Sheikh Mansour Bin Mohammed Al Maktoum - Chairman 
Sami Al Qamzi - Deputy Chairman

Board Members
Abdul Majeed Hussain
Ibrahim Abdul-Malik
Khalid Buhumaid
Jamal Al Mehairi
Ali Al-Habsi
Saeed Rashid

Honours

28 Official Championships

Domestic Competitions
UAE Pro League: 7
Champions: 1974–75, 1975–76, 1979–80, 2005–06, 2008–09, 2013–14, 2015–16

UAE President's Cup: 10 (Record)
Champions: 1974–75, 1976–77, 1987–88, 1995–96, 2001–02, 2003–04, 2007–08, 2012–13, 2018–19, 2020–21

UAE League Cup: 5 (Record)
Champions: 2011–12, 2013–14, 2016–17,  2018–19, 2020–21
UAE Super Cup: 5
Champions: 2009, 2013, 2014, 2016, 2020

Continental competitions
AFC Champions League
Runners-up (1): 2015

Friendly competitions
Emirati-Moroccan Friendship Super Cup
Winners (1): 2016

 See Al Shabab SC and Dubai CSC for respective club championships.

References

External links

 
Soccerway Profile

 

 
 
Football clubs in Dubai
 Football clubs in the United Arab Emirates
1958 establishments in the Trucial States
Association football clubs established in 1958